The Fraeylemaborg is a borg in the village of Slochteren in the Netherlands. At present the Fraeylemaborg is a historic house museum. The museum had  in 2013.

Building history

Fraeylemaborg is the most important of the borgen in the province of Groningen. These strong houses or keeps were built in the Middle Ages to store harvests and to protect their produce from robbers. Besides churches, these structures were the only buildings that used durable stone and masonry. In due time they grew to become centres of power and wealth. The Fraeylemaborg is located in the middle of the town of Slochteren which upon its discovery in 1959 gave its name to the largest gasfield in the world.

In 1475 there was already a farm with the name Frealemaheerd. In the archives of 1504 the name is found of one Remmer Fraeylema. The building originates from the 16th century. The left wing was built in the 17th century. In 1680 the borg was sold by Evert Rengers, son of the former lord of the manor, because of his family debts. It was bought by Henric Piccardt (married to Anna Elizabeth Rengers, Evert's sister), who borrowed the necessary funds from Stadtholder William III. Piccardt extensively rebuilt the borg and he also landscaped a huge formal garden in the style of Louis XIV's France. After Piccardt's death the borg fell into disrepair. In 1781 the Fraeylemaborg was sold to Hendrik de Sandra Veldman. He rebuilt it into the shape it has today. Among his innovations was the removal of two towers which had graced the front square.

Garden

Administration 

Marjon Edzes-Posthumus is the museum director and Henny van Harten-Boers is the curator of the Fraeylemaborg.

The museum had  in 2014. It is one of the most-visited museums in the province of Groningen.

The Fraeylemaborg is a member of Museumhuis Groningen (Groningen Museum House), which is an umbrella organization for museums and heritage institutions in the province of Groningen.

References 

 Kalkwiek, K.A., A.I.J.M. Schellart, H.P.H. Jansen & P.W. Geudeke, Atlas van de Nederlandse kastelen, Alphen aan den Rijn 1980
 Helsdingen, H.W. van, Gids voor de Nederlandse kastelen en buitenplaatsen, Amsterdam 1966
 Tromp, H.M.J., Kijk op kastelen Amsterdam 1979
 Battjes, Jan, & Ladrak, Hans, De toren uit het midden. Bouwhistorie en ontwerpmethodiek van de Fraeylemaborg en het Slochterbos, Groningen: Monnier 2010

External links 

 

Historic house museums in the Netherlands
Borgs in Groningen (province)
Museums in Groningen (province)
Rijksmonuments in Groningen (province)
Midden-Groningen